Inkersall and Inkersall Green (informally referred to by local residents as Inky) are areas of settlement in Derbyshire, England.

Inkersall is a town just outside Staveley, which has seen fast development over the last few years. Recent developments include the creation of a small children's park along with the building of an additional convenience shop. Inkersall has two public houses, the Hop Flower and the Double Top. 

The village is served by a regular bus service, allowing residents to travel to Staveley, Chesterfield and elsewhere. The Trans Pennine Trail passes alongside the village.

Education
Located on the main road through Inkersall is the Infant and Primary School, which also includes a Nursery. This school has been located here for many years, and the Infant School playground has recently been improved and now has a host of different play areas.

Pupils generally feed into Netherthorpe School or Springwell Community College, both of which are in Staveley.

History
The history of Inkersall was affected by nearby Rufford Abbey. The English Pope, Adrian IV, gave his blessing for the abbey in 1156 and following this the abbey's lands expanded and the villagers of Cratley, Rufford, Grimston and Inkersall were evicted.
  The 'Inkersall' mentioned immediately above was cleared for the extension of the Rufford Abbey lands around the monastery in Nottinghamshire, it should not be confused with Inkersall near Staveley in Derbyshire.

References

Hamlets in Derbyshire
Chesterfield, Derbyshire